Mikael Johansson (born June 27, 1985) is a Swedish professional ice hockey centre, currently an unrestricted free agent. He most recently played under contract with the SCL Tigers of the Swiss National League (NL). He was selected by the Detroit Red Wings in the 9th round (289th overall) of the 2003 NHL Entry Draft.

Playing career 
Johansson came through the youth ranks of Arvika HC. During the 2004–05 season, he played his first minutes in the Swedish second division HockeyAllsvenskan with Bofors IK and made his debut with Färjestad BK in the top-flight Swedish Hockey League (SHL) one year later. He spent eight years with the club, winning the Swedish championship three times (2006, 2009, 2011), interrupted by a stint with Hamilton Bulldogs of the American Hockey League in 2009-10 after signing with NHL's Montreal Canadiens who sent him to their AHL affiliate.

Johannson signed with fellow SHL side Leksands IF for the 2013–14 season, followed by one season in Switzerland with NLA club Rapperswil-Jona. He then returned to Färjestad BK in 2015.

In May 2016, he agreed to terms with HC Lada Togliatti of the Kontinental Hockey League (KHL).

Career statistics

References

External links

1985 births
Arvika HC players
Bofors IK players
Brynäs IF players
Detroit Red Wings draft picks
Dizel Penza players
Färjestad BK players
Hamilton Bulldogs (AHL) players
HC Davos players
HC Lada Togliatti players
HIFK (ice hockey) players
Leksands IF players
Living people
People from Arvika Municipality
SC Rapperswil-Jona Lakers players
SCL Tigers players
Swedish ice hockey left wingers
Sportspeople from Värmland County